Elina Maria Rodríguez   is an Argentine volleyball player. She is part of the Argentina women's national volleyball team. She competed at the 2020 Summer Olympics.

References

1997 births
Living people
Argentine women's volleyball players
Olympic volleyball players of Argentina
Volleyball players at the 2020 Summer Olympics
Sportspeople from Santa Fe, Argentina
Argentine expatriate sportspeople in Italy
Argentine expatriate sportspeople in France
Expatriate volleyball players in Italy
Expatriate volleyball players in France
Pan American Games bronze medalists for Argentina
Pan American Games medalists in volleyball
Volleyball players at the 2019 Pan American Games
Medalists at the 2019 Pan American Games